The Fencer (is a 2015 biographical drama film about the life of Endel Nelis, an accomplished Estonian fencer and coach. It was directed by Klaus Härö and written by Anna Heinämaa. Filming began in Estonia in late February 2014.

The film was selected as the Finnish entry for the Best Foreign Language Film at the 88th Academy Awards, making the December shortlist of nine films, but it was not nominated. The Fencer was also nominated for the Golden Globe award in the Best Foreign Language Film category as a Finnish-German-Estonian co-production.

The Fencer was released in the U.S. by CFI Releasing in 2017.

Plot
During the Second World War, Estonia was occupied by Nazi Germany, who drafted most of the men into the German army, and then occupied by the Soviet Union, who considered Estonians who had fought in the German army to be criminals. Following the war, the Soviets incorporated Estonia into the USSR.

A young man, Endel Nelis, arrives in Haapsalu in the early 1950s, having left Leningrad to escape the secret police.  He finds work as a teacher and founds a sports club for his students, where he starts teaching them his great passion – fencing. Disapproving, the school's principal starts investigating Endel’s background. Meanwhile, Endel's Russian friend (and coach) Aleksei warns him not to return to Leningrad under any circumstances.

Fencing becomes a form of self-expression for the children, and Endel becomes a role model and father figure.  He learns to love the children, many of whom had been orphaned by the war. When the children want to participate in a national fencing tournament in Leningrad, Endel must make a choice; risk everything to take the children to Leningrad or put his safety first and disappoint them.

Cast
 Märt Avandi – Endel Nelis
 Ursula Ratasepp – Kadri
 Hendrik Toompere Jr. – school principal
 Liisa Koppel – Marta	
 Joonas Koff – Jaan 
 Lembit Ulfsak – Jaan's grandfather
 Piret Kalda – Jaan's mother
 Egert Kadastu – Toomas
 Ann-Lisett Rebane – Lea
 Elbe Reiter – Tiiu	
 Jaak Prints – assistant to the principal
 Kirill Käro – Aleksei
 Leida Rammo – guard in a dormitory
 Raimo Pass – officer
 Erkki Tikan – officer
 Maria Avdjuško – an official in Leningrad
 Alina Karmazina –	coach from Armenia

Critical response
On Rotten Tomatoes, the film has an approval rating of 85% based on 52 reviews, and an average score of 7/10. The site's critical consensus reads, "The Fencers inspirational coming-of-age arc is given added heft through sensitive direction, affecting performances, and a moving, fact-based story." On Metacritic, the film has a score of 60 out of 100, based on 13 critics, indicating "mixed or average reviews".

See also
 List of submissions to the 88th Academy Awards for Best Foreign Language Film
 List of Finnish submissions for the Academy Award for Best Foreign Language Film

References

External links
 
 The Fencer review at Variety
 Official Site (Making Movies Oy)
 The Fencer U.S. release (CFI Releasing)

2015 films
2010s biographical drama films
2010s sports drama films
Finnish biographical drama films
Finnish drama films
Estonian drama films
Estonian-language films
Films set in Estonia
Films set in the 1950s
Films shot in Estonia
Films directed by Klaus Härö
Films about the Soviet Union in the Stalin era
Films about Soviet repression
Films about sportspeople
Fencing coaches
Fencing films
2015 drama films